Melchers is a surname of German language origin, originally found mostly in North Rhine-Westphalia (the former Prussia).

People with this surname include:
 Claudia Melchers (born 1969), Dutch businesswoman and kidnapping victim
 Cor Melchers (1954–2015), Dutch painter
 Corinne Melchers (1880–1955), American painter, humanitarian, and gardener
 Gari Melchers (1860–1932), American painter
 Hans Melchers (born 1938), Dutch businessman
 Julius Theodore Melchers (1829–1908), American sculptor
 Marie Melchers (born 1939), Belgian fencer
 Mirjam Melchers (born 1975), Dutch cyclist
 Paul Melchers (1813–1895), German Roman Catholic clergyman
 Saskia Melchers (born 1962), Dutch cricketer

The Melchers Building, the oldest commercial building in Honolulu, Hawaii, was named for one of its original occupants, trader Gustav C. Melchers.

See also
Melcher (disambiguation)

References

Surnames of German origin